Sonia Moore (December 4, 1902 – May 19, 1995) was a Russian Empire-born American actress, writer and acting teacher. She is known for simplifying Stanislavski's system of acting devised by Konstantin Stanislavski. Moore was a student of Yevgeny Vakhtangov, and later became an acting teacher.

Early life 
Born in Gomel, Russian Empire on December 4, 1902. She went to the Moscow Art Theatre's Third Studio to study acting under Russian theatre practitioner Yevgeny Vakhtangov  in 1920.  She married Lev Borisovich Helfand after her husband's death in 1957, Sonia decided to open a school of acting to bring the up-dated and revised teachings of Stanislavski in America. 

in 1961 she founded the Sonia Moore Studio of the Theatre in New York City.

Contribution to Stanislavsky acting system 

In 1960 her book The Stanislavski Method  got published to clarifying the many misunderstandings and distortions surrounding on Stanislavski's theories, which occurred during the development of  "Method Acting", which later revised under the title The Stanislavski System. she also simplified the method of simple physical action.

Works 

 The Stanislavski System: The Professional Training of an Actor; Second Revised Edition in 1984.

 Stanislavski Revealed: The Actor's Complete Guide to Spontaneity on Stage republished in 2000.

 Training an Actor: The Stanislavski System in Class published in 1997.

 The Stanislavski System: The Professional Training of an Actor by Sonia Moore published in 1965.

See also 

 Michael Chekhov
 Uta Hagen
 Estelle Harman
 Robert Lewis
 Lee Strasberg
 Sanford Meisner

References

External links 
Sonia Moore on Filmreference

Acting theorists
Drama teachers
Soviet emigrants to the United States
1902 births
1995 deaths